Santa Cruz de Andamarca District is one of twelve districts of the province Huaral in Peru.

See also 
 Puwaq Hanka
 Puwaq Hanka mountain range
 Willkaqucha
 Yana Uqsha
 Yanawayin Lake
 Chungar Mine

References